Christopher W. Douglas is an actor, best known for roles on the soap operas One Life to Live as Dylan Moody (1994–1997, 2000) and Passions as Antonio Lopez-Fitzgerald (2001–2004, 2008). in 1994 he appeared in Tori Amos music video for her song Cornflake Girl.

Biography
Douglas studied briefly at the University of Tennessee and has worked as a model. In 2008, Chris Douglas has also hosted the reality television series Feeding Frenzy on Animal Planet.

External links

Antonio Lopez-Fitzgerald profile from Passions Online
Sean Bridges profile from Y&R Online
Dylan Moody profile from OLTL Online

1969 births
Living people
People from Knoxville, Tennessee
Male actors from Tennessee
American male soap opera actors